"Red Light Green Light" is a single by American rapper DaBaby. It was released on June 25, 2021, with an accompanying music video. It was produced by D.A. Got That Dope. The song contains a flute instrumental with snares.

Critical reception
Tom Breihan of Stereogum wrote that the track is a "heedlessly energetic" song, and compared it to DaBaby's song previous single "Ball If I Want To", calling it a "fast rap banger". Regina Cho of Revolt wrote that DaBaby "includes plenty of bars that play off the theme the title".

Music video
The music video, directed by DaBaby himself, sees him in a backyard with a barbecue, and also donning Oakland Raiders (now Las Vegas Raiders) merchandise. It references the films Boyz n the Hood and The Nutty Professor.

Charts

References

 

 
2021 singles
2021 songs
DaBaby songs
Songs written by DaBaby
Songs written by D.A. Got That Dope
Interscope Records singles